Ratko Stevović  (born 24 October 1956) is a Montenegrin football manager.

Managerial career

Zmaj Zemun
Stevović was a coordinator in the junior selections of Zmaj Zemun, Belgrade, Yugoslavia from 1987 to 1989.

FC Mitsubishi
From 1991 to 1992 he was a coach in FC Mitsubishi JFL.

Tohoch Titan
From 1992 to 1994 he was a head coach in FC Tohach Titan JFL.

Liaison Kusatsu
Head coach of the Liaison Kusatsu from 1994 to 1998. He succeeded to introduce the club in 1 league for almost 3 years.

Thespa Kusatsu
Head coach of the Thespa Kusatsu, from 1999 to 2002.

GPL
Head coach in Greece Premier League 2002-2003.

Mornar
From 2006 to 2007 Stevović was a head coach in FK Mornar (Montenegro league).

Bratstvo
Head coach in FC Bratstvo (Montenegro league) in Montenegro 2011-2012.

Bokelj
Head coach in FC Bokelj (Montenegro league) from 2012-2013.

Berane
In 2014, he was a head coach in FC Berane (Montenegro league).

1956 births
Living people
Sportspeople from Nikšić
Serbia and Montenegro football managers
Montenegrin football managers
Thespakusatsu Gunma managers
FK Mornar managers
FK Iskra Danilovgrad managers
Serbia and Montenegro expatriate football managers
Expatriate football managers in Japan
Serbia and Montenegro expatriate sportspeople in Japan